Tamaki is both a Japanese surname and a unisex Japanese given name, as well as a Māori name. In the Okinawan language, Tamaki is read as Tamagusuku, Tamagushiku or Tamashiro. Notable people with the name include:

Surname 

Koji Tamaki (玉置浩二) (born 1958), Japanese singer/songwriter
Brian Tamaki (born 1958), leader of Destiny Church, based in New Zealand
Denny Tamaki, Japanese politician, governor of Okinawa Prefecture
Hiroshi Tamaki (born 1980), an actor, singer, and model from Nagoya, Aichi Prefecture, Japan
Jillian Tamaki, Canadian illustrator and writer
Mariko Tamaki, Canadian artist and writer
Nami Tamaki (born 1988), pop singer from Wakayama Prefecture, Japan
Yuichiro Tamaki, Japanese politician
Yukiko Tamaki (born 1980), Japanese voice actress

Given name 

, Japanese actress
, Japanese voice actress and actress
, Japanese singer
Tamaki Kunishi, Japanese musician, member of post-rock group Mono

Fictional characters 
, from the Dead or Alive series.
 from My Hero Academia
, protagonist of the manga series Magic of Stella
 in ToHeart2
 from Fire Force
 in Bamboo Blade
 in Ouran High School Host Club
 from Magia Record
, a character in the anime series A Place Further Than The Universe
 from Code Geass

References 
Japanese-language surnames
Japanese unisex given names
Okinawan surnames